Lars Lundström (23 August 1914 – 30 June 1982) was a Swedish sailor. He competed in the 6 Metre event at the 1952 Summer Olympics.

References

External links
 

1914 births
1982 deaths
Swedish male sailors (sport)
Olympic sailors of Sweden
Sailors at the 1952 Summer Olympics – 6 Metre
People from Solna Municipality
Sportspeople from Stockholm County
20th-century Swedish people